Michelle Marquais ( Pouvreau; 19 May 1926 – 29 January 2022) was a French actress. She graduated from CNSAD in 1952 and became well known within theatre as well as film. She was married to painter , with whom she had two daughters: Manuelle and Sarah. Marquais died in Paris on 29 January 2022, at the age of 95.

Filmography
The Taking of Power by Louis XIV (1966)
 (1972)
 (1979)
La Reine Margot (1994)
Villa Amalia (2009)

Awards
 Officer of the Order of the Arts and the Letters (1986)

References

1926 births
2022 deaths
20th-century French actresses
21st-century French actresses
Actresses from Paris
Officiers of the Ordre des Arts et des Lettres